In mathematics, Wiener's lemma is a well-known identity which relates the asymptotic behaviour of the Fourier coefficients of a Borel measure on the circle to its atomic part. This result admits an analogous statement for measures on the real line. It was first discovered by Norbert Wiener.

Statement
Then

 Similarly, given a real or complex Borel measure  on the real line  and called  its atomic part, we have

Proof
 First of all, we observe that if  is a complex measure on the circle then

Hence, by the dominated convergence theorem,

This complex measure has Fourier coefficients . By Fubini's theorem

So, by the identity derived earlier,

By Fubini's theorem again, the right-hand side equals

 The proof of the analogous statement for the real line is identical, except that we use the identity

(which follows from Fubini's theorem), where .
So, by dominated convergence, we have the analogous identity

Consequences
 A real or complex Borel measure  on the circle is diffuse (i.e. ) if and only if .
 A probability measure  on the circle is a Dirac mass if and only if . (Here, the nontrivial implication follows from the fact that the weights  are positive and satisfy , which forces  and thus , so that there must be a single atom with mass .)

References

Lemmas in analysis